Robert Cholmondeley, 1st Viscount Cholmondeley (died 22 May 1681) was an English peer.

Lord Cholmondeley was the son of Hugh Cholmondeley and Mary Bodvile. Sir Hugh Cholmondeley was his grandfather and Robert Cholmondeley, 1st Earl of Leinster, his uncle. He succeeded to the estates of his uncle Lord Leinster in 1659 and two years later he was raised to the Peerage of Ireland as Viscount Cholmondeley, of Kells in the County of Meath. Cholmondeley married Elizabeth Cradock, daughter of George Cradock of Caverswall Castle. He died in May 1681, and was succeeded in the viscountcy by his eldest son Hugh, who was created Earl of Cholmondeley in 1706. His second son George became a prominent soldier.

References
Kidd, Charles, Williamson, David (editors). Debrett's Peerage and Baronetage (1990 edition). New York: St Martin's Press, 1990.

www.thepeerage.com

1681 deaths
Viscounts in the Peerage of Ireland
Peers of Ireland created by Charles II
Robert
Year of birth unknown